Kanchi Kaul (born 24 May 1982) is an Indian actress who predominantly appeared in Telugu films and Hindi television shows. 

She is best known for playing Ananya Sachdev-Samarth in the show Ek Ladki Anjaani Si opposite Shakti Anand and Shraddha in the show Ek Nanad Ki Khushiyon Ki Chaabi...Meri Bhabhi.

Career
In 2001, Kanchi Kaul made her debut with the successful Telugu film Sampangi. In 2002, she began work on two Tamil language films, Columbus co-starring Raju Sundaram, and Kasthuri Raja's Paattuchaththam Kedkuthamma. Neither film eventually completed production. Another Tamil film titled Viyugam shot in 2004 under the stage name of Spandana, co-starring Hari Bhaskar, was also not released.

Personal life 
Kanchi Kaul is married to actor Shabbir Ahluwalia and they have two sons born in 2014 and 2016.

Kaul took a break from television and made her comeback in 2013 with the show Ek Nanad Ki Khushiyon Ki Chaabi...Meri Bhabhi.

Filmography

Television

Films

References

External links
 

Kashmiri people
Indian television actresses
1982 births
Living people
Indian soap opera actresses
Indian film actresses
Actresses from Jammu and Kashmir
Actresses in Telugu cinema